ChemSusChem is a biweekly peer-reviewed scientific journal established in 2008 and published by Wiley-VCH on behalf of Chemistry Europe. The editor-in-chief is David J. Smith. The journal covers research at the interface of chemistry and sustainability, including contributions from materials science, chemical engineering, and biotechnology. It publishes full papers, communications, reviews, concepts, highlights, and viewpoints.

According to the Journal Citation Reports, the journal has a 2021 impact factor of 9.140.

References

External links

Chemistry Europe academic journals
Wiley-VCH academic journals
English-language journals
Chemistry journals
Sustainability journals
Biweekly journals